The 2019 Women's Twenty20 Cup, known for sponsorship reasons as the 2019 Vitality Women's Twenty20 Cup was the 11th cricket Women's Twenty20 Cup tournament. It took place in June, with 35 teams taking part: 33 county teams plus Scotland and Wales. Warwickshire Women won the Twenty20 Cup, as winners of Division 1, therefore achieving their first title. 

The tournament followed the 50-over 2019 Women's County Championship, and was subsequently followed by the Twenty20 2019 Women's Cricket Super League, competed for by regional teams.

Competition format

Teams played matches within a series of divisions with the winners of the top division being crowned the Champions. Matches were played using a Twenty20 format.

The championship works on a points system with positions within the divisions being based on the total points. Points were awarded as follows:

Win: 4 points. 
Tie: 2 points. 
Loss: 0 points.
Abandoned/Cancelled: 1 point.

Teams 
The 2019 Women's Twenty20 Cup was divided into three divisions: Division One and Division Two with nine teams each, and Division Three with 17 teams, divided into regional groups. Teams in Divisions One and Two played each other once, and teams in Division Three played each other either once or twice.

Division One 

 Source: ECB Women's Twenty20 Cup

Division Two 

 Source: ECB Women's Twenty20 Cup

Division Three

Group A

 Source: ECB Women's Twenty20 Cup

Group B

 Source: ECB Women's Twenty20 Cup

Group C

 Source: ECB Women's Twenty20 Cup

Statistics

Most runs

Source: CricketArchive

Most wickets

Source: CricketArchive

References

Women's Twenty20 Cup
 
2019 in Scottish cricket
cricket
cricket